The Colegio Israelita de México A.C., providing services as Colegio Israelita de México ORT, is a private K-12 school in Lomas de Vista Hermosa, Cuajimalpa, Mexico City. It is also known by its acronym, CIM, or as the Idishe, the first word in its Yiddish name.

The school was founded in 1924, when a group of immigrants decided to create an educational institution for the children of Jewish immigrants arriving in Mexico.

The school first operated in Colombia No. 39; it moved to Colombia No. 12 from 1925 through 1927. It then moved to Naranjo no. 267 and grew significantly during the 1930s, with the first 6th grade graduation taking place in 1933. In 1935, it moved to San Lorenzo no. 290, where it would remain until the 1970s. The school began to operate a Secundaria (grades 7 through 9) in 1936, with the first 9th grade graduation taking place in 1938. It also began operating a kindergarten in 1936. The school added a Preparatoria (grades 10 and 11) in 1948, and when Mexico switched to a 12 grade system in the mid 1960s, it added a grade 12.

The school is currently located in Loma del Recuerdo no. 44 in Vista Hermosa, Mexico City.

References

Further reading
 1924–1974. 50º Aniversario del Colegio Israelita. Libro conmemorativo. September, 1975.

External links
 Official site

Jewish day schools
Jewish schools in Mexico
Jews and Judaism in Mexico City
High schools in Mexico City
Cuajimalpa
Private schools in Mexico
Educational institutions established in 1924
1924 establishments in Mexico
Yiddish culture in North America